Petar Gorša (born 11 January 1988) is a Croatian sports shooter. He competed at the 2008, 2012 and 2016 Summer Olympics.

At the 2008 Olympics, he competed in the 10 m air rifle, the 50 m rifle prone and the 50 m rifle three positions, finishing in 37th, 49th and 44th position respectively.  At the 2012 Olympics, he only competed in the 10 m air rifle, finishing in 43rd.  At the 2016 Summer Olympics, he competed in the 50 m rifle prone, the 50 m rifle three positions and the 10 m air rifle.  He reached the final of the 10 m air rifle finishing in 7th.

References

External links
 

1988 births
Living people
ISSF rifle shooters
Croatian male sport shooters
Olympic shooters of Croatia
Shooters at the 2008 Summer Olympics
Shooters at the 2012 Summer Olympics
Shooters at the 2016 Summer Olympics
Sportspeople from Bjelovar
Shooters at the 2015 European Games
European Games silver medalists for Croatia
European Games medalists in shooting
Shooters at the 2019 European Games
Shooters at the 2020 Summer Olympics
21st-century Croatian people